The 1975 European Baseball Championship was held in Spain and was won by Italy. The Netherlands finished as runner-up.

Standings

References
(NL) European Championship Archive at honkbalsite

European Baseball Championship
European Baseball Championship
1975
1975 in Spanish sport